Ghulam Nabi is a male Muslim given name. It is the name of:

Mian Ghulam Nabi Shori (1742–1792), Indian composer of Hindustani classical music
Khan Bahadur Ghulam Nabi Kazi (1884–1955), educationist in British India
Aftab Ghulam Nabi Kazi (1919–2016), Pakistani politician
Bashir Ghulam Nabi Kazi (1921–1986), Pakistani judge
Ghulam Nabi Firaq (born 1922), Kashmiri poet, writer and an educationist
Gholam Nabi Nasher (1926–2010), Afghan politician
Ghulam Nabi Azad (born 1949), Indian politician
Syed Ghulam Nabi Fai (born 1949), American citizen of Kashmiri origin, imprisoned for conspiracy and tax evasion
Ghulam Nabi Bhat, also called Fareed Parbati (1961–2011), Urdu language poet and writer from Kashmir
Ghulam Nabi Sheikh (died 2003), Indian singer and composer
Ghulam Nabi (died 2007), the victim of the beheading of Ghulam Nabi

See also
Ghulam Nabi Kelay, village in Helmand Province, Afghanistan
Chah-e Haji Qolamnabi, village in Sistan and Baluchestan Province, Iran